Wild Blood may refer to:

 Wild Blood (1915 film), a 1915 American silent short drama film
 Wild Blood (1928 film), a 1928 American silent western film
 Wild Blood (2008 film), a 2008 Italian film
 Wild Blood (album), a 2012 album by Lovedrug
 Wild Blood (novel), a 1999 fantasy novel by Kate Thompson
 Wild Blood (video game), a fantasy-themed video game